Diéguez is a surname. Notable people with the surname include:

Adrián Diéguez (born 1996), Spanish footballer
José Diéguez Reboredo (1932-2022), Spanish Roman Catholic prelate
Margarita Diéguez Armas, Mexican diplomat
Míriam Diéguez (born 1986), Spanish footballer
Rosario Hernández Diéguez (1916-1936), Spanish Galician newspaper hawker and trade unionist

Spanish-language surnames